The Moroccan Women Throne Cup is a women's association football competition in Morocco. pitting regional teams against each other. It was established in 2007. It is the women's equivalent of the Moroccan Throne Cup for men. The winner of the 2020 edition is AS FAR for the 8 times.

Finals 
The list of winners and runners-up:

Most successful clubs

See also 
 Moroccan Women's Championship

References

External links 
 Coupe du trône - FRMF official website

 
MAR
Women's football competitions in Morocco
Cup